Bonaventure Uwizeyimana (born January 4, 1993) is a Rwandan cyclist, who last rode for UCI Continental team .

Career
Uwizeyimana won the 5th stage at the 2014 La Tropicale Amissa Bongo. In 2017, he won a stage at the Tour du Rwanda.

Uwizeyimana competed in the road race at the 2014 Commonwealth Games and the under-23 road race at the 2014 UCI Road World Championships, but did not finish either race.

Major results

2013
 2nd Road race, National Road Championships
 9th Asmara Circuit
2014
 1st Stage 5 La Tropicale Amissa Bongo
 3rd Road race, National Road Championships
2015
 4th Team time trial, African Road Championships
 5th Overall Grand Prix Chantal Biya
 6th Overall La Tropicale Amissa Bongo
1st  Young rider classification
 6th Overall Tour d'Oranie
 6th Overall Tour d'Annaba
 6th Grand Prix Fkih Ben Saleh, Challenge des phosphates
 10th Circuit d'Alger
2016
 National Road Championships
1st  Road race
3rd Time trial
2017
 1st Stage 5 Tour of Rwanda
 6th Overall La Tropicale Amissa Bongo
 9th Asmara Circuit
 9th Massawa Circuit
2018
 1st  Overall Tour du Cameroun
1st  Points classification
1st Stage 5
 4th Overall Tour du Sénégal
2019
 1st  Road race, National Road Championships

References

External links

Living people
1993 births
Rwandan male cyclists
Commonwealth Games competitors for Rwanda
Cyclists at the 2014 Commonwealth Games
Cyclists at the 2018 Commonwealth Games
People from Kigali